African Studies is a peer-reviewed scholarly journal publishing articles in the fields of anthropology, linguistics, history, sociology, politics, geography, and literary and cultural studies. It was founded in 1921 under the title Bantu Studies.

Abstracting and indexing 
The journal is indexed in Sociological Abstracts, International Political Science Abstracts, Applied Social Science Index, International Bibliography of the Social Sciences, Current Bibliography on African Affairs, and Abstracts in Anthropology.

African studies journals
Publications established in 1921
Routledge academic journals
Triannual journals